The 2023 Clemson Tigers softball team is the varsity college softball team that represents Clemson University during the 2023 NCAA Division I softball season.  This is the fourth season of Clemson's softball program.  The Tigers compete in the Atlantic Coast Conference (ACC) and are led by head coach John Rittman.  Clemson plays its home games at McWhorter Stadium in Clemson, South Carolina.

During the season, on March 8, Valerie Cagle became the first Clemson pitcher to throw a perfect game in program history.  The game came against  at home.

Previous Season 
The Tigers finished the 2022 season 42–17 overall and 14–10 in ACC play to finish in fifth place. As the fifth seed in the ACC Tournament, they earned a bye into the Quarter finals where they defeated fourth seed Notre Dame. In the Semifinals they defeated first seed Virginia Tech, but fell to third seed Florida State in the Final. This marked the back-to-back appearances in the Final of the ACC Tournament in the program's first two full seasons. The Tigers were selected, via at-large bid, as the tenth overall seed in the NCAA Tournament. They hosted a regional and were placed into the Stillwater Super Regional. Clemson lost both games in Stillwater to end their season.

Personnel

Roster

Coaches

Schedule

Rankings

References

Clemson
Clemson Tigers softball seasons
Clemson softball